The Didsbury Mosque, and the Manchester Islamic Centre, are co-located on Burton Road, West Didsbury, in Manchester, England. The building was originally the "Albert Park Methodist Chapel", which opened for worship in 1883, but in 1962 the chapel closed and was later converted into a mosque. It has an attendance of around 1,000 people. The mosque Sheikh is Mustafa Abdullah Graf.

Distinctive aspects
The Didsbury Mosque and Manchester Islamic Centre says that it "represents a wide range of the Muslim community of various origins and/or Islamic schools of thought".  The mosque holds open-days with displays, talks, question-and-answer sessions, and guided tours. 

Didsbury mosque also have a gardening volunteering group for maintaining their paradise themed garden on Burton Road containing roses, sweet peas, Mediterranean planting, salad garden with pergolas. A Youth group has also been set up encouraging them to play table tennis, badminton, chess and others along with food, Islamic reminders and prayers. 

The mosque has a Sharia (Islamic law) Department which issues fatwas (Islamic decrees), oversees family affairs, helps calculate zakat (a type of alms-giving), and provides advice and mediation with regard to financial transactions.

With radio coverage of most of South Manchester, the mosque broadcasts adhan (Islamic call to prayer), prayers themselves, Friday sermons, and daily reminders, as well as talks and lectures given in the prayer hall of the mosque. The Manchester Islamic Centre is registered as a charity with the Charity Commission.

During the 2021 COVID-19 lockdown they offered hot food and a foodbank for their neighbours and those in need as well as briefly holding a pop-up vaccine centre. On the 21st January 2021 an emergency flood warning given to many Didsbury residents encouraged them to evacuate. In response, the Mosque provided voluntary emergency overnight stay for residents including the Didsbury West councillor.

Attendees

There are strong Libyan ties within the mosque, with various people from the mosque having been involved, in Libya, in the civil war. In 2011, the (current) mosque imam travelled to Libya, where he aided moderate rebel groups to help topple Gaddafi. Another person from the mosque was described variously as a "member" and a "senior member" of the Libyan Islamic Fighting Group. A regular worshipper at the mosque, Abd al-Baset Azzouz, al Qaeda operative left Britain in 2009 to join the terror group’s leader Ayman al-Zawahiri in Pakistan, before heading to Libya to run an al Qaeda network in the east of the country.
 	
At least two British recruits of Islamic State also worshipped at the mosque.
	
In December 2017, mosque attendee Mohammed Abdallah, was jailed for 10 years for being a member of Islamic State, where he was listed as a "specialist sniper".

Response to Manchester Arena bombing 

The perpetrator of the Manchester Arena bombing was identified as Salman Ramadan Abedi, an attendant of the mosque.  His father, Ramadan Abedi (also known as Abu Ismael), called the adhan at the mosque;   his older brother, Ismail Abedi, was a tutor in the mosque's Qur'an school. Both men were arrested.
 	
The mosque released a statement condemning the terror attack. The mosque also held a moment of silence to remember the victims of the bombing.

Muslims opposed to militant Islamic ideologies, cited by the Voice of America, have said that the mosque must bear some responsibility for Abedi's radicalisation because of the conservative Salafi brand of Islam it allegedly espouses. Rashad Ali, senior fellow at the Institute for Strategic Dialogue and counter-terror expert, told Vice News the mosque preached a "fairly radical, puritan" brand of Salafist Islam and was "effectively taken over at certain points by various Libyan militia groups, including ones associated with the Muslim Brotherhood." He said the Abedi family subscribed to a radical political strain of Salafism – a background which suggested the bomber would have had a shorter pathway to radicalisation than others. According to a secret recording unveiled by the BBC, 10 days before the Abedi bought his concert ticket, Mostafa Graf, the imam of the Didsbury Mosque, made a call for armed jihad, according to scholars.
	
One attendee said in 2017 that allegedly, "every other Friday khutba [sermon] at Didsbury was about how bad ISIS are" and that the bomber allegedly, "hated the mosque.", whereas another attendee said Salman Abedi "learned the Qur’an by heart" at the mosque. On 4 November 2017 the mosque was put on lockdown after receiving a "threatening letter".

Arson
On the 10th and 11th of September 2021 an arson attack caused minor damage to a door.  Passers by helped put the fire out.  Police have CCTV footage and are investigating, they are asking for help from anyone with dashcam footage or other information that may help in their enquiries.  Police stated, “We believe there were several vehicles that may have driven past at the time and would ask anyone who may have any dashcam footage to get in touch.” and asked witnesses to call -0161 856 4973- or -0800 555 111- anonymously. Furthermore it was also revealed that they had received threats to destroy the mosque for a period before the arson.

See also
Islam in the United Kingdom
Islamic terrorism
Islamic schools and branches
Islamism
List of mosques
List of mosques in the United Kingdom

References

External links

 Didsbury Mosque Website
 Didsbury Mosque Virtual Tour 
 Didsbury Mosque, YouTube channel
 Manchester Islamic Centre, YouTube channel

Churches completed in 1883
Former Methodist churches in the United Kingdom
Mosques converted from churches in Europe
Mosques in Manchester
Mosque-related controversies in Europe